List of First Nations Reserves in Saskatchewan, Canada

See also: list of rural municipalities in Saskatchewan, Canada
See also: List of communities in Saskatchewan, Canada
See also: List of Indian reserves in Canada

There are over 70 Indian reserves in all of Saskatchewan.

A
Ahtahkakoop 104
Amisk Lake 184
Amiskosakahikan 210
Asimakaniseekan Askiy 102A
Asimakaniseekan Askiy 102B
Assiniboine 76
Atim Ka-mihkosit Reserve

B
Barkwell Bay 192I
Beardy's 97 and Okemasis 96
Beardy's & Okemasis' 96 & 97-A
Beardy's & Okemasis' 96 & 97-B
Beardy's & Okemasis' 96 & 97-C
Beauval Forks 192O
Big Island Lake Cree Territory
Big River 118
Big River 118A
Birch Portage 184A
Bittern Lake 218
Budd's Point 20D
Buffalo River Dene Nation 193

C
Cable Bay 192M
Cable Bay 192N
Canoe Lake 165
Canoe Lake 165A
Canoe Lake 165B
Carrot River 29A
Carry the Kettle 76-1
Carry the Kettle 76-2
Carry the Kettle 76-3
Carry the Kettle 76-4
Carry the Kettle 76-5
Carry the Kettle 76-6
Carry the Kettle 76-7
Carry the Kettle 76-8
Carry the Kettle 76-9
Carry the Kettle 76-10
Carry the Kettle 76-11
Carry the Kettle 76-12
Carry the Kettle 76-13
Carry the Kettle 76-14
Carry the Kettle 76-15
Carry the Kettle 76-17
Carry the Kettle 76-18
Carry the Kettle 76-19
Carry the Kettle 76-20
Carry the Kettle 76-21
Carry the Kettle 76-22
Carry the Kettle 76-23
Carry the Kettle 76-24
Carry the Kettle 76-25
Carry the Kettle 76-28
Carry the Kettle 76-29
Carry the Kettle 76-30
Carry the Kettle 76-31
Carry the Kettle 76-32
Carry the Kettle 76-33
Carry the Kettle 76-34
Carry the Kettle 76-35
Carry the Kettle 76-36
Carry the Kettle 76-37
Carry the Kettle 76-38
Carry the Kettle 76-40
Carry the Kettle 76-41
Carry the Kettle 76-42
Carry the Kettle 76-43
Carry the Kettle 76-44
Carry the Kettle 76-45
Carry the Kettle 76-46
Carry the Kettle 76-47
Carry the Kettle 76-48
Carry the Kettle 76-49
Carry the Kettle 76-50
Carry the Kettle 76-51
Carry the Kettle 76-52
Carry the Kettle 76-53
Carry the Kettle 76-54
Carry the Kettle 76-55
Carry the Kettle 76-56
Carry the Kettle 76-57
Carry the Kettle 76-58
Carry the Kettle 76-59
Carry the Kettle 76-60
Carry the Kettle 76-61
Carry the Kettle 76-62
Carry the Kettle 76-63
Carry the Kettle 76-64
Carry the Kettle 76-65
Carry the Kettle 76-66
Carry the Kettle 76-67
Carry the Kettle 76-69
Carry the Kettle 76-70
Carry the Kettle 76-71
Carry the Kettle 76-72
Carry the Kettle 76-73
Carry the Kettle 76-74
Carry the Kettle 76-75
Carry the Kettle 76-76
Carry the Kettle 76-77
Carry the Kettle 76-78
Carry the Kettle 76-79
Carry the Kettle 76-80
Carry the Kettle 76-81
Carry the Kettle 76-82
Carry the Kettle 76-84
Carry the Kettle 76-86
Carry the Kettle 76-87
Carry the Kettle 76-88
Carry the Kettle 76-89
Carry the Kettle 76-91
Carry the Kettle 76-110
Chicken 224
Chicken 225
Chicken 226
Chief Joseph Custer Reserve
Chief Philip Morin 232
Chitek Lake 191
Churchill Lake 193A
Clearwater River Dene 221
Clearwater River Dene 222
Clearwater River Dene 223
Cote 64
Cowessess 73
Cowessess 73A
Cumberland House Cree Nation 20
Cumberland 100A

D
Day Star 87
Denare Beach Indian Settlement
Deschambault Lake Indian Settlement
Dipper Rapids 192C

E
Eagles Lake 165C
Elak Dase 192A
English River 192H

F
Fishing Lake 89
Fishing Lake 89A
Fishing Lake 89D1
Flatstone Lake 192L
Flying Dust 105
Flying Dust 105D
Flying Dust 105E
Flying Dust 105F
Flying Dust 105H
Flying Dust 105I
Flying Dust 105J
Flying Dust 105L
Flying Dust 105O
Fond du Lac 227
Fond du Lac 228
Fond du Lac 229
Fond du Lac 231
Fond du Lac 232
Fond du Lac 233
Four Portages 157C
Fox Point 157D
Fox Point 157E

G
George Gordon First Nation 86
George Gordon First Nation 86-3
George Gordon First Nation 86-4
George Gordon First Nation 86-5
Gordon 86
Gladue Lake 105B
Gold Eagle Reserve
Grandmother's Bay 219
Grasswoods 192J
Grizzly Bear's Head 110 & Lean Man 111

H
Haultain Lake 192K
Haylands 75A

I
Île-à-la-Crosse 192E

J
James Smith 100

K
Kahkewistahaw 72
Kahkewistahaw 72A-1
Kahkewistahaw 72A-2
Kahkewistahaw 72B
Kahkewistahaw 72C
Kahkewistahaw 72D
Kahkewistahaw 72E
Kahkewistahaw 72F
Kahkewistahaw 72G
Kahkewistahaw 72H
Kahkewistahaw 72I
Kahkewistahaw 72J
Kahkewistahaw 72K
Kahkewistahaw 72L
Kahkewistahaw 72M
Kahkewistahaw 72P
Kahkewistahaw 72Q
Kahkewistahaw 72W
Kahkewistahaw 72X
Kawacatoose 88
Keeseekoose 66
Keeseekoose 66-CA-01
Keeseekoose 66-CA-02
Keeseekoose 66-CA-03
Keeseekoose 66-CA-04
Keeseekoose 66-CA-05
Keeseekoose 66-CA-06
Keeseekoose 66-CA-08
Keeseekoose 66-CH-01
Keeseekoose 66-CH-03
Keeseekoose 66-CH-04
Keeseekoose 66-CO-01
Keeseekoose 66-CO-02
Keeseekoose 66-KE-01
Keeseekoose 66-KE-02
Keeseekoose 66-KE-03
Keeseekoose 66-KE-04
Keeseekoose 66-KE-05
Keeseekoose 66-KE-06
Keeseekoose 66-SA-01
Keeseekoose 66-SA-02
Keeseekoose 66-ST-01
Keeseekoose 66-ST-02
Keeseekoose 66-ST-03
Keeseekoose 66-ST-04
Kinistin Pwatinahk 203
Kinistin 91
Kinistin 91A
Kinoosao-Thomas Clarke 204
Kipahigan Sakahikan 222
Kiskaciwan 208
Kiskinwuhumatowin

Kistapinan 211
Kistapinânihk 231
Kitsakie 156B
Knee Lake 192B

L

La Plonge 192
Lac la Hache 220
Last Mountain Lake 80A
Lake Pitihkwakew 102B
Leaf Rapids 192P
Little Black Bear 84
Little Black Bear 84SC
Little Bone 74B
Little Hills 158
Little Hills 158A
Little Hills 158B
Little Pine 116 
Little Red River 106C
Little Red River 106D
Lucky Man Reserve

M
Makaoo 120
Makwa Lake 129
Makwa Lake 129A
Makwa Lake 129B
Makwa Lake 129C
Manawanstawayak 230
Maskikopawiscikosik 229
Mawdsley Lake 192R
McKay 209
Meadow Lake 105A
Meadow Lake 105C
Min-a-he-quo-sis 116A
Min-a-he-quo-sis 116C
Ministikwan 161
Ministikwan 161A
Minoahchak 74C
Mirond Lake 184E
Mistahi Wasahk 209
Mistik Reserve
Mistawasis 103
Mistawasis 103A
Mistawasis 103B
Mistawasis 103C
Mistawasis 103D
Mistawasis 103E
Mistawasis 103F
Mistawasis 103G
Mistawasis 103H
Mistawasis 103I
Mistawasis 103J
Mistawasis 103L
Montreal Lake 106
Montreal Lake 106B
Moosomin 112A
Moosomin 112B
Moosomin 112E
Moosomin 112F
Moosomin 112G
Moosomin 112H
Moosomin 112J
Moosomin 112K
Moosomin 112L
Moosomin 112M
Moosomin 112N
Moosomin 112P
Moosomin 112S
Morin Lake 217
Mosquito 109
Mosquito-Grizzly Bear's Head-Lean Man
Muscowpetung 80
Muskeg Lake 102
Muskeg Lake 102B
Muskeg Lake 102C
Muskeg Lake 102D
Muskeg Lake 102E
Muskeg Lake 102F
Muskeg Lake 102G
Muskeg Lake 102H
Muskeg Lake 102J
Muskeg Lake 102K
Muskeg Lake 102L
Muskeg Lake 102M
Muskoday Reserve
Muskoday 99A
Muskoday 99B
Muskowekwan 85
Muskowekwan 85A
Muskowekwan 85-1
Muskowekwan 85-2
Muskowekwan 85-2A
Muskowekwan 85-3
Muskowekwan 85-4
Muskowekwan 85-6
Muskowekwan 85-7
Muskowekwan 85-8
Muskowekwan 85-9
Muskowekwan 85-10
Muskowekwan 85-11
Muskowekwan 85-12
Muskowekwan 85-13
Muskowekwan 85-14
Muskowekwan 85-15
Muskowekwan 85-16
Muskowekwan 85-17
Muskowekwan 85-18
Muskowekwan 85-19
Muskowekwan 85-20
Muskowekwan 85-21
Muskowekwan 85-22
Muskowekwan 85-23
Muskowekwan 85-24
Muskowekwan 85-25
Muskowekwan 85-26
Muskowekwan 85-27
Muskowekwan 85-28
Muskowekwan 85-29
Muskowekwan 85-30
Muskowekwan 85-31
Muskowekwan 85-32
Muskowekwan 85-33
Muskowekwan 85-34
Muskowekwan 85-35
Muskowekwan 85-36
Muskowekwan 85-37
Muskowekwan 85-38
Muskowekwan 85-39
Muskowekwan 85-40
Muskowekwan 85-41
Muskowekwan 85-42
Muskowekwan 85-43
Muskowekwan 85-44
Muskowekwan 85-45
Muskowekwan 85-46
Muskowekwan 85-47
Muskowekwan 85-48
Muskowekwan 85-49
Muskowekwan 85-50
Muskowekwan 85-51
Muskowekwan 85-52
Muskowekwan 85-53
Muskowekwan 85-54
Muskowekwan 85-55
Muskowekwan 85-56
Muskowekwan 85-57
Muskowekwan 85-58
Muskowekwan 85-59
Muskowekwan 85-60
Muskowekwan 85-61
Muskowekwan 85-62
Muskowekwan 85-63
Muskowekwan 85-64
Muskowekwan 85-65
Muskowekwan 85-66
Muskowekwan 85-67
Muskowekwan 85-68
Muskowekwan 85-69
Muskowekwan 85-70
Muskowekwan 85-71
Muskowekwan 85-72
Muskowekwan 85-73
Muskowekwan 85-74
Muskwaminiwatim 225

N
Nakaway Ahkeeng Reserve
Nakiskatowaneek 227
Nekaneet Cree Nation
Nemekus Sakahikan 221
Northern Lights 220

O
Ocean Man 69
Ocean Man 69A
Ocean Man 69B
Ocean Man 69C
Ocean Man 69D
Ocean Man 69E
Ocean Man 69F
Ocean Man 69G
Ocean Man 69H
Ocean Man 69I
Ocean Man 69N
Ocean Man 69S
Ocean Man 69U
Ocean Man 69X
Ochapowace 71-1
Ochapowace 71-2
Ochapowace 71-3
Ochapowace 71-4
Ochapowace 71-5
Ochapowace 71-6
Ochapowace 71-7
Ochapowace 71-8
Ochapowace 71-9
Ochapowace 71-10
Ochapowace 71-11
Ochapowace 71-12
Ochapowace 71-13
Ochapowace 71-14
Ochapowace 71-15
Ochapowace 71-16
Ochapowace 71-17
Ochapowace 71-18
Ochapowace 71-19
Ochapowace 71-20
Ochapowace 71-21
Ochapowace 71-22
Ochapowace 71-23
Ochapowace 71-24
Ochapowace 71-25
Ochapowace 71-26
Ochapowace 71-27
Ochapowace 71-28
Ochapowace 71-29
Ochapowace 71-30
Ochapowace 71-31
Ochapowace 71-32
Ochapowace 71-33
Ochapowace 71-34
Ochapowace 71-35
Ochapowace 71-36
Ochapowace 71-37
Ochapowace 71-38
Ochapowace 71-39
Ochapowace 71-40
Ochapowace 71-41
Ochapowace 71-42
Ochapowace 71-43
Ochapowace 71-44
Ochapowace 71-45
Ochapowace 71-46
Ochapowace 71-47
Ochapowace 71-48
Ochapowace 71-49
Ochapowace 71-50
Ochapowace 71-51
Ochapowace 71-52
Ochapowace 71-53
Ochapowace 71-54
Ochapowace 71-55
Ochapowace 71-56
Ochapowace 71-57
Ochapowace 71-59
Ochapowace 71-60
Ochapowace 71-61
Ochapowace 71-62
Ochapowace 71-63
Ochapowace 71-64
Ochapowace 71-65
Ochapowace 71-66
Ochapowace 71-67
Ochapowace 71-68
Ochapowace 71-69
Ochapowace 71-70
Ochapowace 71-71
Ochapowace 71-72
Ochapowace 71-73
Ochapowace 71-74
Ochapowace 71-75
Ochapowace 71-76
Ochapowace 71-77
Ochapowace 71-78
Ochapowace 71-79
Ochapowace 71-80
Ochapowace 71-82
Ochapowace 71-83
Ochapowace 71-84
Ochapowace 71-86
Ochapowace 71-87
Ochapowace 71-88
Ochapowace 71-89
Ochapowace 71-91
Ochapowace 71-92
Ochapowace 71-93
Ochapowace 71-94
Ochapowace 71-95
Ochapowace 71-96
Ochapowace 71-97
Ochapowace 71-98
Ochapowace 71-99
Ochapowace 71-100
Ochapowace 71-101
Ochapowace 71-102
Ochapowace 71-103
Ochapowace 71-104
Ochapowace 71-105
Ochapowace 71-106
Ochapowace 71-107
Ochapowace 71-108
Ochapowace 71-109
Ochapowace 71-110
Ochapowace 71-112
Ochapowace 71-115
Ochapowace 71-116
Ochapowace 71-117
Ochapowace 71-118
Ochapowace 71-119
Ochapowace 71-120
Ochapowace 71-121
Ochapowace 71-122
Ochapowace 71-123
Ochapowace 71-124
Ochapowace 71-125
Ochapowace 71-126
Ochapowace 71-127
Ochapowace 71-129
Ochapowace 71-130
Ochapowace 71-131
Ochapowace 71-132
Okanese 82
Okanese 82A
Okanese 82B
Okanese 82C
Okanese 82D
Okanese 82E
Okanese 82F
Okanese 82G
Okanese 82H
Okanese 82I
Okanese 82J
Okanese 82K
Okanese 82L
Okanese 82M
Okanese 82N
Okanese 82O
Okanese 82P
Okanese 82Q
Okanese 82R
Okanese 82S
Okanese 82T
Okanese 82U
Okanese 82V
Okanese 82W
Okanese 82X
Okanese 82Y
Okanese 82Z
Okanese 82AA
Okanese 82BB
Okanese 82CC
Okanese 82DD
Okanese 82EE
Okanese 82FF
Okanese 82GG
Okanese 82HH
Old Fort 157B
One Arrow 95
One Arrow 95-1A
One Arrow 95-1B
One Arrow 95-1C
One Arrow 95-1D
One Arrow 95-1E
One Arrow 95-1F
One Arrow 95-1G
One Arrow 95-1H
One Arrow 95-1I
One Arrow 95-1J
Onion Lake 119-1
Onion Lake 119-2

P
Pasqua 79
Peepeekisis 81
Pelican Lake 191A
Pelican Lake 191B
Pelican Lake 191C
Pelican Lake 191D
Pelican Narrows 184B
Pelican Narrows 206
Peter Ballantyne Cree Nation
Pheasant Rump 68
Pheasant Rump 68A
Pheasant Rump 68B
Pheasant Rump 68C
Pheasant Rump 68D
Pheasant Rump 68E
Pheasant Rump 68F
Pheasant Rump 68H
Piapot 75
Piapot 75E
Piapot 75F
Piapot 75G
Piapot 75H
Piapot 75I
Piapot 75J
Piapot 75K
Piapot 75T
Piapot Urban Reserve
Pine Bluff 20A
Pine Bluff 20B
Pinehouse Lake Indian Settlement
Pisiwiminiwatim 207
Poorman 88
Potato River 156A
Poundmaker 114
Poundmaker 114-1A
Poundmaker 114-2A
Poundmaker 114-2B
Poundmaker 114-2C
Poundmaker 114-3A
Poundmaker 114-3B
Poundmaker 114-4A
Poundmaker 114-5A
Poundmaker 114-5B
Poundmaker 114-6A2
Poundmaker 114-6A3
Poundmaker 114-6B2
Poundmaker 114-6C2
Poundmaker 114-7A
Poundmaker 114-8A
Poundmaker 114-9
Poundmaker 114-9A
Poundmaker 114-10A
Poundmaker 114-11A
Poundmaker 114-12
Poundmaker 114-13
Poundmaker 114-15
Poundmaker 114-15C
Poundmaker 114-16
Poundmaker 114-17
Poundmaker 114-17A
Poundmaker 114-18A
Poundmaker 114-18B
Poundmaker 114-19
Poundmaker 114-21
Poundmaker 114-22
Poundmaker 114-28
Poundmaker 114-29
Primeau Lake 192F

R
Red Earth 29
Red Pheasant 108
Roadside 165F

S
Sabitawasis Beach 89 C-1
Sakimay 74
Sakimay 74A
Sakimay 74B
Sakimay 74C
Sakimay 74-1
Sakimay 74-2
Sakimay 74-3
Sakimay 74-4
Sakimay 74-5
Sakimay 74-6
Sakimay 74-7
Sakimay 74-9
Sakimay 74-10
Sakimay 74-11
Sakimay 74-12
Sakimay 74-14
Sakimay 74-16
Sakimay 74-17
Sandy Bay Indian Settlement
Sandy Narrows 184C
Saulteaux 159
Saulteaux 159A
Saulteaux 159B
Saulteaux 159C
Saulteaux 159D
Saulteaux 159E
Saulteaux 159F
Saulteaux 159G
Saulteaux 159H
Saulteaux 159I
Saulteaux 159J
Saulteaux 159L
Saulteaux 159M
Saulteaux 159N
Saulteaux 159O
Saulteaux 159P
Saulteaux 159Q
Saulteaux 159R
Saulteaux 159S
Saulteaux 159T
Saulteaux 159U
Saulteaux 159V
Saulteaux 159W
Saulteaux 159X
Saulteaux 159Y
Saulteaux 159Z
Saulteaux 159AA
Saulteaux 159BB
Saulteaux 159CC
Saulteaux 159DD
Saulteaux 159EE
Saulteaux 159FF
Saulteaux 159GG
Saulteaux 159HH
Saulteaux 159II
Saulteaux 159JJ
Saulteaux 159KK
Saulteaux 159LL
Saulteaux 159MM
Saulteaux 159NN
Seekaskootch 119
Shesheep 74A
Shoal Lake 28A
Slush Lake 192Q
Sokatisewin Sakahikan 224
Sounding Sky Reserve
Southend 200
Southend 200A
Standing Buffalo 78
Stanley 157
Stanley 157A
Star Blanket 83
Star Blanket 83B
Star Blanket 83C
Star Blanket 83D
Star Blanket 83E
Star Blanket 83F
Star Blanket 83G
Star Blanket 83H
Star Blanket 83I
Star Blanket 83J
Star Blanket 83K
Star Blanket 83L
Sturgeon Lake 101
Sturgeon Lake 101A
Sturgeon Lake 101B
Sturgeon Lake 101C
Sturgeon Lake 101D
Sturgeon Lake 101E
Sturgeon Lake 101J
Sturgeon Weir 184F
Sturgeon Weir 205
Sucker River 156C
Sweetgrass 113
Sweetgrass 113A
Sweetgrass 113B
Sweetgrass 113-C7
Sweetgrass 113-C19
Sweetgrass 113-D12
Sweetgrass 113-E22
Sweetgrass 113-F16
Sweetgrass 113-G7
Sweetgrass 113-H1
Sweetgrass 113-I4
Sweetgrass 113-J3
Sweetgrass 113-K32
Sweetgrass 113-L6
Sweetgrass 113-M16
Sweetgrass 113-N27
Sweetgrass 113-O28
Sweetgrass 113-P2
Sweetgrass 113-S6

T
Thomas Morin Reserve
The Key 65
Thunderchild First Nation 115B
Thunderchild First Nation 115C
Thunderchild First Nation 115D
Thunderchild First Nation 115E
Thunderchild First Nation 115F
Thunderchild First Nation 115G
Thunderchild First Nation 115H
Thunderchild First Nation 115I
Thunderchild First Nation 115J
Thunderchild First Nation 115K
Thunderchild First Nation 115L
Thunderchild First Nation 115M
Thunderchild First Nation 115N
Thunderchild First Nation 115Q
Thunderchild First Nation 115R
Thunderchild First Nation 115S
Thunderchild First Nation 115T
Thunderchild First Nation 115U
Thunderchild First Nation 115V
Thunderchild First Nation 115W
Thunderchild First Nation 115X
Thunderchild First Nation 115Z
Tipamahto Aski 95A
Treaty Four Reserve Grounds Indian Reserve No. 77
Turnor Lake 193A
Turnor Lake 193B
Turnor Lake 194

W
Wahpaton 94A
Wahpaton 94B
Wapachewunak 192D
Wapaskokimaw 202
Waskwaynikapik 228
Waskwiatik Sakahikan 223
Waterhen 130
Wa-pii-moos-toosis 83A
Wepuskow Sahgaiechan 165D
White Bear 70
Whitecap 94 
Willow Cree Reserve
Witchekan Lake 117
Witchekan Lake 117D
Wood Mountain 160
Woody Lake 184D

Y
Yellow Quill 90
Yellow Quill 90-8
Yellow Quill 90-9
Yellow Quill 90-10
Yellow Quill 90-11
Yellow Quill 90-18

References

Indian reserves
Indian, Saskatchewan